ν Octantis, Latinised as Nu Octantis, is a spectroscopic binary star in the constellation Octans with a period around 2.9 years. Its apparent magnitude is 3.73. Located around  distant, the primary is an orange giant of spectral type K1III, a star that has used up its core hydrogen and has expanded. The secondary star is likely either a red dwarf or a white dwarf, from its relatively low mass.

Planetary system
In 2009, the system was hypothesised to contain a superjovian exoplanet based on perturbations in the orbital period. A prograde solution was quickly ruled out but a retrograde solution remains a possibility, although the variations may instead be due to the secondary star being itself a close binary, since the formation of a planet in such a system would difficult due to dynamic perturbations.  Further evidence ruling out a stellar variability and favouring the existence of the planet was gathered by 2021.

References

Octans
K-type giants
Spectroscopic binaries
Octantis, Nu
CD-77 1079
107089
8254
205478
Gliese and GJ objects
Hypothetical planetary systems